Marie-Hélène Schiffers is a former Belgian racing cyclist. She finished in third place in the Belgian National Road Race Championships in 1979.

References

External links

Year of birth missing (living people)
Living people
Belgian female cyclists
Place of birth missing (living people)